A block party or street party is a party in which many members of a single community congregate, either to observe an event of some importance or simply for mutual solidarity and enjoyment.  The name comes from the form of the party, which often involves closing an entire city block to vehicle traffic or just a single street.  Many times, there will be a celebration in the form of playing music, games, dance and activities with food such as popcorn machines and barbecues.

As a form of activism street parties are festive and/or artistic efforts to reclaim roadways as public space by large groups of people. They were made known in Western Europe and North America by the actions of Reclaim the Streets, a widespread "dis-organization" dedicated to reclaiming public space from automobiles and consumerism.

Countries

Poland
Poland Orange Alternative staged festive protests to break the Communist government's monopoly on public life.

United Kingdom

In the UK, street parties are mainly known as private residents' events without wider neighbourhood publicity and have a festive cultural meaning, especially in England and southern Wales. They have historically been held to commemorate major national events, such as VE Day or for royal events such as jubilees, with bunting dressing the street, and children having fun in the street. An estimated 10 million people took part in street parties in 1977 for the Queen's Silver Jubilee.

The tradition seems to have begun in the United Kingdom after World War I as residents' organized "peace teas" to celebrate the signing of the Treaty of Versailles in 1919.

The tradition was boosted for the wedding of Prince William and Kate Middleton in April 2011 with about 1 million people joining in street parties. For the Queen's Diamond Jubilee in June 2012 about 2 million took part.

Some street parties are held annually or at any time for residents to meet their neighbours in a traffic-free street in a private street party. Some "street parties" are public events taking many forms.

An application may need to be made to the local authority to close a road for a street party  who will arrange a temporary traffic regulation order under the Road Traffic Regulation Act 1984. The council may charge a fee if traffic needs to be diverted.

United States

Block parties are reported as a World War I innovation originating from the East Side of New York City, where an entire block was insulated and patriotic songs sung and a parade held to honor the members of that block who had gone off to war. Traditionally, many inner city block parties were actually held illegally, because they did not file for an event permit from the local authorities. However, police turned a blind eye to them.

In the United States, block parties usually occur on holidays such as Independence Day and Memorial Day. Some towns may also have an annual block party.

Block parties gained popularity in the United States during the 1970s, particularly within the hip hop community. Block parties were often held outdoors and power for the DJ's sound system was taken illegally from streetlights, as referenced in the song "South Bronx" by KRS-One.

Sometimes, the occasion may be a theme such as a recent popular film or "welcome to our town" for a new family. Often block parties involve barbecues and lawn games such as Simon Says, karaoke, and group dancing such as the Electric Slide, the Macarena or line dancing. In many small towns, the local fire department may also participate in the party, bringing out trucks that they display for show.

See also
Banquet
Botellon
Demoparty
LAN party
Mifflin Street Block Party
Notting Hill Carnival
Street reclaiming
Tactical frivolity

References

External links
 Street party

Parties
Social phenomena
DIY culture
Party